Søren Kierkegaard as Philosopher is an 1896 book about Søren Kierkegaard by philosopher Harald Høffding. Its publication marked a significant turning-point in German philosophy, which formally introduced and disseminated Kierkegaard's philosophy to Germany and the rest of Continental Europe by the beginning of the 20th century. Søren Kierkegaard as Philosopher was one of the first German studies of Kierkegaard to treat him as a coherent philosopher and theologian, and raised questions that became central to Kierkegaard studies and to German lebensphilosophie generally.

References

External links
 Sören Kierkegaard als Philosoph at the Internet Archive

1896 non-fiction books
German non-fiction books
Books about Søren Kierkegaard